Agali Hills (Attapadi hills) is a small tribal village and hill station in the Palakkad district of Kerala, India. It lies at the base of Malleswaran peak, and is situated in the Attappadi forest reserve, bordering Silent Valley National Park.

References

External links

Villages in Palakkad district